Alecu (or Alexandru) Donici (January 19, 1806 – January 21, 1865) was a Moldavian, later Romanian poet and translator.

Biography 

He was the first of four children of Dimitrie Donici and wife Ileana Lambrino. He studied at the Saint Petersburg Military Academy, and became a junior lieutenant in the Russian army. He was of boyar origin. Aleksandr Pushkin lived in the Donici family house during his exile in 1820-1823. After 1828, Donici assumed the duties of a civil servant in Chişinău, but later on he chose to resign and in 1835 settled in Iași, where most of his literary career unfolded. His chief work, a two-volume book of fables titled Fabule ("Fables"), was published in Iaşi in 1840; it shows the strong influence of Ivan Krylov.

He translated the works of Aleksandr Pushkin and Antioch Kantemir.

Gallery

External links

1806 births
1865 deaths
People from Orhei District
Romanian poets
Romanian male poets
Moldovan writers
Moldovan male writers
Romanian translators
19th-century translators
19th-century poets
19th-century male writers